Lyon-Perrache is a large railway station located in the Perrache district, in the 2nd arrondissement of Lyon, France. The station was opened in 1857 and is located on the Paris–Marseille railway, Lyon–Geneva railway and Moret–Lyon railway. The train services are operated by SNCF and include TGV, Intercity and local services.

The station was built in 18 months starting in 1855 by François-Alexis Cendrier for the Chemin de fer de Paris à Lyon. From the beginning it was designed as a central station unifying the lines of the three companies then serving Lyon, which merged to form the Chemins de fer de Paris à Lyon et à la Méditerranée (PLM) as the station was opening. The building was built in classical style and is composed of a double rooftop and a large passenger building.

The station lost its view of the city when an intermodal terminal (combining local public transit and intercity buses) and dual-carriageway highway were built in front of it in the 1970s. Although much modern building has somewhat tarnished the look of the area, the station retains many of its original features:
The station front features the names of towns served by trains departing Lyon-Perrache.
The platforms are covered by two twin iron rooftops.

It is the terminus of the LGV Sud-Est line, the high-speed railway line from Paris. It is also served by conventional trains from other parts of France, and is the terminus of line  of the Lyon Metro.  It is also the terminus of one of the Lyon tram lines.

Today, however, Perrache is no longer the primary rail station serving Lyon. Instead, the Gare de Lyon-Part-Dieu, constructed in the 1970s in a large planned business district outside the central city, acts as the more popular embarkation point for most high-speed trains, especially to Paris and the north.

Future

A rebuilding of the station is planned for completion by 2020, with a view to improving the intermodal terminal, which by then will be 50 years old.

Train services
Saint-Étienne, Roanne, Bourgoin-Jallieu, Villefranche, Vienne, Bourg-en-Bresse and Ambérieu.

The station is served by the following services:

High speed services (TGV) Paris - Lyon
Intercity services (Intercités) Nantes - Tours - Bourges - Lyon
Intercity services (Ouigo) Paris - Dijon - Lyon
Regional services (TER Auvergne-Rhône-Alpes) Lyon - Ambérieu - Bellegarde - Genéve
Regional services (TER Auvergne-Rhône-Alpes) Lyon - Valence - Montelimar - Orange - Avignon
Local service (TER Auvergne-Rhône-Alpes) Lyon - Ambérieu - Aix-les-Bains - Chambéry

iDBus
Since 17 December 2012, SNCF's national and international coach network, iDBus, serves Lyon-Perrache.

Paris - Lyon
Paris - Lyon - Milan
Paris - Lyon - Turin
London - Paris Charles de Gaulle Airport - Lyon
Paris Charles de Gaulle Airport - Lyon
Lyon - Barcelona

See also
Hôtel Terminus

References

External links
 
Timetables TER Auvergne-Rhône-Alpes 

Lyon Metro stations
2nd arrondissement of Lyon
Perrache
Railway stations in France opened in 1857
Lyon-Perrache